Serro is a Brazilian municipality located in the state of Minas Gerais. The city belongs to the metropolitan area of Belo Horizonte and to the microregion of Conceição do Mato Dentro.  As of 2020, the estimated population was 20,940.

In colonial times the city was known by the name Vila do Príncipe. In this city were born Emerico Lobo de Mesquita, one of the most prominent composers of the Classicism movement in Brazil, and Gomes Carneiro, a general who fought on the Paraguayan War and on the Federalist Revolution.

Serro is well known for its traditional cheese, cultural richness, colonial influence and unique environment.

The municipality contains part of the  Pico do Itambé State Park, created in 1998.

See also
 List of municipalities in Minas Gerais

References

External links

Municipalities in Minas Gerais